Manjanady  is a village in the Indian state of Karnataka, India. It is located in the Mangalore taluk of Dakshina Kannada district in Karnataka.

Demographics
 census of India, Manjanady had a population of 10,435 with 5245 males and 5190 females.
Manjanady is a large village located near Mangalore University in the district of Mangalore (Dakshin Kannada) state of Karnataka, India.
It has a population of about 10,435 or more persons living in around 1,695 households
near to SEZ.Infosys and the 2 medical colleges with hospitals (NITTE & YENEPOYA medical colleges). 
The Manjanady gram panchayat (MGP) is located at Mangalathi.And slowly it is gaining township after the setup of YENEPOYA Ayurveda college in Kollarakodi which is administered by Naringana Gram Panchayat.

See also

 Dakshina Kannada
 Districts of Karnataka

References

External links
 http://dk.nic.in/

Villages in Dakshina Kannada district
Localities in Mangalore